Bert W. O’Malley is the Tom Thompson Distinguished Service Professor of Molecular and Cellular Biology and Chancellor at Baylor College of Medicine. A native of Pittsburgh, he has a bachelor's degree from the University of Pittsburgh (A&S 1959) and a M.D. from their School of Medicine (1963). He completed his residency at Duke University and spent four years at the National Institute of Health followed by four years serving as the Luscious Birch Professor and the director of the Reproductive Biology Center at Vanderbilt University. He then moved to Baylor as Professor and Chairman of Molecular and Cellular Biology.

O’Malley's work has been on the primary actions of steroid hormones and nuclear receptors. Bert elucidated the overall genetic transcriptional pathway of steroid and intracellular hormone action, discovered nuclear receptor(NR) coactivators (CoAs), discovered the functional 3-D structures CoA-NR complexes on DNA, and the critical roles for coactivators in physiology and diseases.  He has published over 700 papers and holds 29 patents in the fields of gene regulation, molecular endocrinology and steroid receptors and transcriptional coactivators. His work on molecular mechanisms of steroid receptor coactivators has great relevance to genetic and reproductive diseases, disorders of metabolism and diabetes, myocardial infarct induced heart failure, and especially, cancers. He is considered as  the 'father of molecular endocrinology' and has received over 65 national/international awards/prizes for his scientific achievements in this field.

He was awarded the National Medal of Science by U.S. President George W. Bush on September 29, 2008.

O'Malley is a brother of the Pi Kappa Alpha fraternity and was initiated at the Gamma Sigma chapter at the University of Pittsburgh.

Honors and awards
Dickson Prize, 1979
Fred Conrad Koch Medal in 1998
President of the Endocrine Society in 1985
Member National Academy of Sciences, 1992
Rodbell Award (NIH) in 2001
Antonio Feltrinelli International Prize for Biology in 2001
Brinker Award in Breast Cancer Research in 2001
Pasarow Award in Cancer Research in 2006
Carl Hartman Award for Reproductive Research in 2007
National Medal of Science, 2008
Steven Beering Award in Medical Research in 2009
Ernst Schering Prize, 2011 
Ipsen Foundation Research Prize in Endocrinology in 2013
Outstanding Innovation Award (End.Soc.) in 2015
Jensen Lifetime Achievement Award (U.Cinn.) in 2018
Louisa Gross Horwitz Prize, 2018 
Memberships: American Assoc. Physicians; National Academy of Medicine; National Academy of Inventors.
Fellow, American Academy of Arts and Sciences, 1996
Fellow, American Academy of Microbiology
Fellow American Association for the Advancement of Science
Fellow American Association for Cancer Research
 honorary doctorate Karolinska Institute
 honorary doctorate New York University
 honorary doctorate National University of Ireland
 honorary doctorate University of Maryland
 honorary doctorate University of Pittsburgh
 honorary doctorate University of Athens, Greece

 All publications: http://www.ncbi.nlm.nih.gov/sites/myncbi/bert.o'malley.1/bibliography/43117136/public/?sort=date&direction=ascending

References

biography

American endocrinologists
National Medal of Science laureates
University of Pittsburgh alumni
University of Pittsburgh School of Medicine alumni
Living people
Members of the United States National Academy of Sciences
Year of birth missing (living people)
Members of the National Academy of Medicine